is a 1969 Japanese epic war film directed by Seiji Maruyama, with special effects by Eiji Tsuburaya. The film stars Toshiro Mifune, Yūzō Kayama, Tatsuya Nakadai, Toshio Kurosawa, Makoto Satō, Ryutaro Tatsumi, Chishū Ryū, and Matsumoto Kōshirō VIII. In the film, the Imperial Japanese Navy and army fail in their attempts to seize Port Arthur, and the Russian Pacific Fleet bears down on the Japan Sea during the Russo-Japanese War.

Battle of the Japan Sea was the last film for Eiji Tsuburaya before his death. A dedicated team of 60 artists worked on the 107 miniature ships created for the film. In addition, the miniature of the battleship Mikasa was made up to 13 meters long. Due to the weaker shell power during the Russo-Japanese War in the Pacific War, Freon gas was used to represent the water column in the naval battle scene.

Cast

Production

Special effects
Battle of the Japan Sea was the last film for special effects director Eiji Tsuburaya before his death. A dedicated team of 60 artists worked on the 107 miniature ships created for the film. In addition, the miniature of the battleship Mikasa was made up to 13 meters long. Due to the weaker shell power during the Russo-Japanese War in the Pacific War, Freon gas was used to represent water column in the naval battle scene.

Release
Battle of the Japan Sea was distributed theatrically in Japan by Toho on August 1, 1969. During its theatrical release, the film earned . It was released on DVD in Japan on June 21, 2001, by Toho Home Video.

Notes

References

Bibliography

External links

1969 films
1960s war films
Toho films
Films produced by Tomoyuki Tanaka
Films set in 1904
Films set in 1905
1960s Japanese-language films
Toho tokusatsu films
1960s Japanese films
Japanese epic films
Japanese war films
War epic films
Russian-language Asian films
Russo-Japanese War
Films about naval warfare
Films set in Tokyo